Tim Kellaway (7 October 1891 – 31 December 1952) was a British long-distance runner. He competed in the marathon at the 1912 Summer Olympics.

References

1891 births
1952 deaths
Athletes (track and field) at the 1912 Summer Olympics
British male long-distance runners
British male marathon runners
Olympic athletes of Great Britain
People from Marylebone
Athletes from London